Chariot is a former research site on the coast of the Chukchi Sea in the western part of North Slope Borough in the U.S. state of Alaska. It is located close to the mouth of Ogotoruk Creek in the Ogotoruk Valley, 10 km ESE of Cape Thompson, Arctic Slope. Maximum elevation is 20 meters.

The place was named around 1962 after Project Chariot by personnel of the project. The name likely refers to a headquarters building on the site.

References

See also
List of places in Alaska/C

Populated places in North Slope Borough, Alaska
Chukchi Sea